The 2014–15 Women's EHF Cup was 34th edition of EHF's third-tier women's handball competition. It started on 17 October 2014.

Overview

Team allocation
The labels in the parentheses show how each team qualified for the place of its starting round:
TH: Title holders
2nd, 3rd, 4th, 5th, 6th, etc.: League position

Round and draw dates
All draws held at the European Handball Federation headquarters in Vienna, Austria.

Qualification stage

Round 2
Teams listed first played the first leg at home. Some teams agreed to play both matches in the same venue. Bolded teams qualified into the third round.

|}
Notes

a Both legs were hosted by IUVENTA Michalovce.
b Both legs were hosted by Kyndil Tórshavn.
c Both legs were hosted by Karpaty.

d Both legs were hosted by Anagennisi Arta.
e Both legs were hosted by SPONO Nottwil.
f Both legs were hosted by PDO Salerno.

Round 3
Teams listed first played the first leg at home. Some teams agreed to play both matches in the same venue. Bolded teams qualified into last 16.

|}
Notes

a Both legs were hosted by Érd.
b Both legs were hosted by PDO Salerno.
c Both legs were hosted by HB Dudelange.

d Both legs were hosted by Muratpaşa Bld. SK.
e Both legs were hosted by Dunărea Brăila.
f Both legs were hosted by Lada Togliatti.

Knockout stage

Last 16

Seedings

Matches
Teams listed first played the first leg at home. Some teams agreed to play both matches in the same venue. Bolded teams qualified into quarter finals.

|}
Notes

a Both legs were hosted by Érd.
b Both legs were hosted by Tvis Holstebro.

c Both legs were hosted by Issy Paris.

Quarter-final
Teams listed first played the first leg at home. Some teams agreed to play both matches in the same venue. Bolded teams qualified into semi finals.

|}

Semi-finals
Teams listed first played the first leg at home. Some teams agreed to play both matches in the same venue. Bolded teams qualified into the Finals.

|}

Finals
Teams listed first played the first leg at home.

|}

See also
2014–15 Women's EHF Champions League
2014–15 Women's EHF Cup Winners' Cup
2014–15 Women's EHF Challenge Cup

References

External links
Women's EHF Cup (official website)

Women's EHF Cup
EHF Cup Women
EHF Cup Women